is a 1981 Japanese war film directed by Shue Matsubayashi. The film is a retelling of the downfall of Japan's Imperial Navy during World War II.

Plot
In 1940, despite the opposition of the commander-in-chief of the Combined Fleet, Admiral Isoroku Yamamoto (Keiju Kobayashi) and other officers, Japan signs the Tripartite Pact with Nazi Germany and Fascist Italy as it prepares for expansion in Southeast Asia. Masato Odagiri, son of shipwright Takeichi Odgairi, graduates from the Imperial Japanese Naval Academy. A year later, his friend, Eiichi Hongo, is promoted to naval lieutenant.

During the attack on Pearl Harbor, Eiichi is in the raid as part of a Val dive bomber crew from the aircraft carrier Zuikaku. The raid is a success, but is tempered by the absence of the American carrier fleet. In February 1942, the battleship Yamato is designated as Yamamoto's flagship, and Takeichi is drafted as a reservist. He is assigned to the ship as a launch pilot.
 
Not long afterwards, the Americans launch a counterstrike on Japan in the Doolittle Raid. Following this, Yamamoto assembles the Kido Butai in order to mount a massive naval strike at Midway, but the Japanese carrier force is met and sunk by the US carriers. Several months later, after the Guadalcanal campaign, Yamamoto is assassinated as American pilots intercept and shoot down his plane. Eiichi returns home to Japan and marries his fiancée, but is soon recalled to participate in the Battle of Leyte Gulf. Off Cape Engaño, the Zuikaku is sunk, and Eiichi is among the casualties as he had given his life jacket to Shinji, Masato's younger brother, who was assigned to the ship as a navigator. Elsewhere, the Yamato, now serving as the flagship of Takeo Kurita's Center Force, withdraws from Leyte without having engaged in battle.
 
In April 1945, the Yamato is assigned to participate in Operation Ten-Go, a suicide mission to Okinawa. Shinji has also been reassigned to serve on the battleship. Masato, now a kamikaze pilot, is also due to participate, and asks Shinji to stay with Takeichi during the battle. As the Yamato and her accompanying fleet sails down to Okinawa, it is intercepted by American planes and sunk with heavy loss of life. Shinji and Takeichi are both killed in battle. Masato observes the sinking, while contemplating on his own death. The film ends on a scene of Eiji's wife, child, and father playing on a beach as the credits roll.

Cast
 Keiju Kobayashi as Isoroku Yamamoto
 Toshiyuki Nagashima as Eiichi Hongo
 Nobuo Kaneko as Chūichi Nagumo
 Eitaro Ozawa as Osami Nagano
 Hiroyuki Nagato as Takeda
 Ichiro Nakatani as Kōsaku Aruga
 Toru Abe as Takeo Kurita
 Kei Satō as Shigenori Kami
 Jun Tazaki as Soemu Toyoda
 Yoshitaka Tamba as Mogi
 Yūko Kotegawa
 Kenichi Kaneda as Shinji Hongo
 Junkichi Orimoto as Obayashi
 Takuya Fujioka as Shigeru Fukudome
 Kōji Takahashi as Matome Ugaki
 Kiichi Nakai as Masato Odagiri
 Akihiko Hirata as Shimoda
 Tomoko Naraoka as Utako Hongo
 Susumu Fujita as Koshirō Oikawa
 Tatsuya Mihashi as Ryūnosuke Kusaka
 Tetsurō Tamba as Jisaburō Ozawa
 Kōji Tsuruta (special appearance)
 Hisaya Morishige as Naoki Hongo

Production

Release
Imperial Navy was released theatrically in Japan where it was distributed by Toho on 8 August 1981. The film was the highest grossing domestic production in Japan in 1981. The film was released in the United States by Toho International on 28 November 1983. It was released to home video by Sony with an English-language dub.

Historical accuracy
While the film is generally accurate in its portrayal of the Pacific War, two inaccuracies occur during the Battle of Leyte sequence. In the film, the Center Force is seen withdrawing from battle at the San Bernardino Strait. In fact, it had engaged the Taffy 3 unit of the Seventh Fleet for two hours off Samar before withdrawing from the battle; in addition, the sequence in which the Zuikaku is sunk was reversed with the withdrawal.

See also
 List of Japanese films of 1981

References

Footnotes

Sources

 

1981 films
1980s war films
1980s historical films
Films produced by Tomoyuki Tanaka
Toho films
Cultural depictions of Isoroku Yamamoto
Films scored by Katsuhisa Hattori
Films about Kamikaze
Films set on aircraft carriers
Japanese historical films
Japanese World War II films
Japanese war films
World War II naval films
Pacific War films
World War II films based on actual events
Films set in 1941
Films set in 1942
Films set in 1943
Films set in 1944
Films set in 1945
Films set in Tokyo
Films set in the Pacific Ocean
Films about naval aviation
Films about naval warfare